The John C. Butler class were destroyer escorts that originated during World War II. The class was also known as the WGT type from their Westinghouse geared turbine drive. Of the 293 ships originally planned, 206 were canceled in 1944 and a further four after being laid down; three were not completed until after the end of World War II.

History

The standard armament for the class was two  dual purpose guns, four 40 mm and ten 20 mm anti-aircraft guns, and three 21-inch (533 mm) torpedo tubes. It also carried two depth charge racks, eight K-gun depth charge projectors and one hedgehog projector as secondary weapons.

She is known in naval lore as "the destroyer escort that fought like a battleship". The other two ships of this class lost were USS Shelton and USS Eversole.

In December 1944, the ship lost her mast and radio antennas riding out Typhoon Cobra, which killed 790 sailors (more than were lost at the battles of Midway and Coral Sea combined). Although damaged and unable to radio for help, she was first on the scene to recover 55 of only 93 total rescued from three destroyers which capsized in the heavy seas.

A floating history museum of the destroyer escorts resides in Albany, New York. (a related ) is docked during temperate months on the Hudson River in Albany, New York.

Ships in class

References

External links
 
 NavSource Online - John C. Butler class destroyer escort
 Destroyer History.org - John C. Butler class destroyer escort

 
Cold War frigates and destroyer escorts of the United States